The Great Test is a 1954 West German drama film directed by Rudolf Jugert and starring Luise Ullrich, Hans Söhnker and Karin Dor. It was shot at the Spandau Studios in West Berlin and on location around the city. The film's sets were designed by the art director Gabriel Pellon.

Synopsis
A female teacher with modern methods take over a rebellious school class. In time she finds romance with the father of one of the students.

Cast

 Luise Ullrich as Helma Krauss
 Hans Söhnker as Dr. Clausen
 Karin Dor as Elena Clausen
 Hans Leibelt as Direktor
 Ernst Schröder as Dr. Rottach
 Ingeborg Morawski as Fräulein Hellgiebel
 Ernst Waldow as Prof. Renard
 Werner Stock as Dietz
 Irina Garden as Turnlehrerin
 Alfred Balthoff as Ministerialrat
 Willi Rose as Pedell
 Arno Paulsen as Stadtrat Ermer
 Hilde von Stolz as Frau Ermer
 Paul Bösiger as Martin Bruck
 Michael Chevalier as Andreas Lang
 Horst Köppen as Fred Bleyer
 Wolfgang Völz as Mops Möller
 Claus Jurichs as Hans Andringer
 Götz George as Peter Behrend
 Maria Sebaldt as Lotte Ermer
 Nina von Porembsky as Otti Ermer
 Susanne Jany as Liese Beer
 Sonia Sorel as Klassenprimus
 Ewald Wenck as Gemüsehändler
 Eva Bubat
 Erich Dunskus
 Stanislav Ledinek
 Erna Sellmer
 Egon Vogel

References

Bibliography

External links 
 

1954 films
1954 drama films
German drama films
West German films
1950s German-language films
Films directed by Rudolf Jugert
Films about educators
Constantin Film films
German black-and-white films
1950s German films
Films shot at Spandau Studios
Films shot in Berlin